Catanzariti is an Italian surname. Notable people with the surname include:

Danielle Catanzariti (born 1992), Australian actress
Franco Catanzariti, Canadian playwright
Tony Catanzariti (born 1949), Australian politician and citrus farmer

Italian-language surnames